Gerash County is located in Fars province, Iran. The capital of the county is Gerash. At the 2006 census, the region's population (as Gerash District of Larestan County) was 39,348 in 8,734 households. The following census in 2011 counted 47,055 people in 12,839 households, by which time the district had been separated from the county to form Gerash County. At the 2016 census, the county's population was 53,907 in 15,155 households.

Gerash was traditionally part of the region of Irahistan. Gerash's inhabitants are Achomi people.

Administrative divisions

The population history and structural changes of Gerash County's administrative divisions over three consecutive censuses are shown in the following table. The latest census shows two districts, four rural districts, and one city.

See also

Larestan
Achomi people
Khonj County
Bastak and Bastak County
Lamerd County

References

 
Counties of Fars Province